Pleurozia is the only genus of liverworts in the family  Pleuroziaceae, which is now classified in its own order Pleuroziales, but was previously included in a broader circumscription of the Jungermanniales. The genus includes twelve species, and as a whole is both physically distinctive and widely distributed.

The lower leaf lobes of Pleurozia species are fused, forming a closed water sac covered by a movable lid similar in structure to those of the angiosperm genus Utricularia. These sacs were assumed to play a role in water storage, but a 2005 study on Pleurozia purpurea found that the sacs attract and trap ciliates, much in the same way as Utricularia. Observations of plants in situ also revealed a large number of trapped prey within the sacs, suggesting that the species in this genus obtain some benefit from a carnivorous habit. After Colura, this was the second report of zoophagy among the liverworts.

Taxonomy
The genus Pleurozia has been subdivided into three subenera:
Pleurozia subg. Pleurozia
Pleurozia gigantea (Weber) Lindberg
Pleurozia subg. Constantifolia Thiers
Pleurozia purpurea Lindberg
Pleurozia conchifolia (Hooker & Arnott) Austin
Pleurozia subg. Diversifolia Thiers
Pleurozia acinosa (Mitten) Trevisan
Pleurozia articulata (Lindberg) Lindberg & Lackström
Pleurozia caledonica (Gottsche ex Jack) Stephani
Pleurozia curiosa Thiers
Pleurozia heterophylla Stephani ex Fulford
Pleurozia johannis-winkleri Herzog
Pleurozia paradoxa (Jack) Schiffner
Pleurozia subinflata (Austin) Austin
Unplaced
Pleurozia pocsii Müller

References

Pleuroziales
Liverwort genera